Hot Ticket is a syndicated movie review and entertainment television program from 2001 to 2004.  The half-hour show was hosted by Leonard Maltin and Todd Newton during its first season, and by Maltin and Joyce Kulhawik in seasons 2 and 3.  It was distributed by Paramount Domestic Television.  The show featured MTV-style fast cutting. For each movie, the hosts voted Hot or Not with red or blue cards.  The show featured film reviews, showing and rating trailers, DVD recommendations, general discussions about film, and short interviews with actors about their upcoming roles.

External links

Hot Ticket at Film.com

Film criticism television series
First-run syndicated television programs in the United States
2001 American television series debuts
2004 American television series endings
Television series by CBS Studios